The Mercedes-Benz A-Class is a compact car produced by the German automobile manufacturer Mercedes-Benz as the brand's entry-level vehicle. The first generation (internally coded W168) was introduced in 1997, the second generation (W169) in late 2004 and the third generation (W176) in 2012. The fourth generation model (W177), which was launched in 2018, marked the first time the A-Class was offered in the United States and Canada. This fourth generation A-Class is also the first to be offered both as a hatchback (W177) and sedan (V177).

Originally manufactured as a five-door hatchback in 1997, the second generation W169 introduced a three-door hatchback. Having grown by  since the original model, the 2012 third generation A-class was longer than the first-generation B-class. The A-Class is sometimes referred to colloquially as the 'Baby Benz', a term also used for the 1982 Mercedes 190 (W201), Mercedes' first compact executive car model.



First generation (W168; 1997)

History 
In 1994, Mercedes-Benz confirmed that it would be launching a compact car - the A-Class (A 160) - by early 1997, and (A 190) by early 1999, which would be the company's first venture in this sector of the market; it was hinted at this stage that the new car would be shorter than the average supermini but as spacious and practical inside as a large family car.

The A-Class was first revealed to the motoring press late in 1996, and finally launched at the Frankfurt Motor Show in the autumn of 1997, the W168 A-Class was quite unusual for Mercedes-Benz featuring a front-wheel drive layout and unusual tall but yet short body and Advantgarde at the 1999 Geneva Motor Show and 1999 Frankfurt Motor Show.

This was the first complete exterior designed by Coventry University trained Steve Mattin, for which he was named Autocar magazine's 'Designer of the Year'. Earlier, Mattin had mostly worked on design for the W210 E-Class in 1991. Concurrent to the W168, he designed the exterior of the W220 S-Class. The final design freeze occurred in January 1995, at 32 months before August 1997 start of production.

The W168 became infamous in 1997 after flipping over during the traditional "elk test" performed by the Swedish automobile publication Teknikens Värld. According to the report, the W168 overturned when manoeuvring to avoid the "elk". Mercedes initially denied the problem, but then took the surprising step of recalling all units sold to date (2,600) and suspending sales for three months until the problem was solved by adding electronic stability control and modifying the suspension. The company spent DM 2.5 billion in developing the car, with a further DM 300 million to fix it.

Between 1997 and 2004, 1.1 million first generation A-Class models had been sold. Overall, Daimler lost €1,440 per vehicle produced.

The A-Class was facelifted in February 2001, with minor alterations to the headlights, front and rear bumper design and the addition of a new  longer wheelbase version. It was launched at the Geneva Motor Show.

Engines 
All A-Class models are powered by four-cylinder engines, with 1.4 L and 1.6 L petrol models at launch (M 166 series), followed by two versions of a 1.7 L diesel engine (OM 668 series). In 1999, a larger 1.9 L petrol model was added, with the 2.1 the last W168 version to be launched in 2002. Also two AMG versions were produced, a 3.2 in 2001 and a 3.8 in 2000, though very few of these were made.

Safety

Production 
DaimlerChrysler invested EUR 900 million in developing the Rastatt plant where the A-Class is produced, and created 1600 new jobs (for a total of 4700). A further 600 people work in the office building at the plant site.

Mercedes-Benz began W168 production on 17 February 1999 at its new Brazilian facility in Juiz de Fora, Minas Gerais. The Brazilian plant was the company's first factory in South America dedicated to passenger cars, with an investment of US$840 million and 10,000 employees. The factory initially produced A-Class and C-Class models, assembling them from pieces manufactured in Germany. The target for the cars was regional markets (from Argentina to Mexico) with modifications made to the cars to suit local conditions, like a protection for the motor base. On 15 August 2005 the factory stopped production of A-Class cars.

Mercedes-Benz A-Class "F-Cell" (2004–) 

It is a version of 5-door A-Class hydrogen fuel cell vehicle with  electric motor.

Three A-Class F-Cell cars were used in the 2003 Frankfurt International Motor Show for press shuttle service. On 18 June 2004, 4 production F-Cell vehicles were delivered to Deutsche Telekom and BEWAG/Vattenfall Europe in Berlin.

In 2007, the A-Class F-Cell were delivered to Landsvirkjun and Reykjavik Energy.

A DHL version of F-Cell was unveiled in FC EXPO 2008.

Second generation (W169; 2004)

Initial release 

The W169 is constructed with high-strength steel alloys with bonded joints. Standard equipment included front as well as combined head and thorax-protection side airbags. The front airbags are adaptive with two-stage gas generators operating according to the severity of accident. Optionally rear side airbags (for side-impacts in the backseats) and side-curtain airbags were available.

The force exerted by the seat belt system during a collision adapts dynamically to collision characteristics. The 'active' head restraints (standard for driver and front passenger) reduce neck injury, especially in rear collisions.

The cargo capacity of the W169 was increased by 15 percent over the W168.

Seven four-cylinder engines were available: four petrol (gasoline) (A 150, A 170, A 200, A 200 Turbo) and three diesel (A 160 CDI, A 180 CDI, A 200 CDI) partnered with either five- or six-speed manual gearbox. A continuously variable transmission system called "Autotronic Constantly Variable Transmission" (CVT) is an optional feature.

The newly developed direct-injection CDI diesel units use a common-rail direct injection system that improves fuel consumption and reduces exhaust emissions and engine noise.

All the engines meet the tight EU4 emissions limits. A particulate filter system is available as an option for the diesel units to reduce particulate emissions by about 99% without the need for additives.

The A-Class is a front wheel drive car and features traction control (ASR) as standard, as well as electronic stability control and anti-lock brakes (ABS).

Handling is improved by precision tracking and anti-roll support, and by a Parabolic Rear Axle.

A "Selective Damping System", in which the shock absorber forces respond differently according to conditions, is standard. For example, under normal conditions it operates at soft absorption; while cornering at speed it changes to full damping force.

Sales of the W169 were targeted at 50,000 units in 2004. Dr. Joachim Schmidt, Executive Vice President Sales and Marketing, Mercedes Car Group, said that target had been reached even before vehicles arrived in dealer showrooms.

Japan models went on sale in 2005-02-04. Early models include 5-door right drive versions of A 170, A 170 Elegance, A 200 Elegance. 5-door right drive version of A 200 TURBO Elegance was added in 2005-11-10. Due to the body width being larger than 1700 mm, it could not be registered as small car in Japan. (See Vehicle size class#Japan)

2008 update 

The W169 Model facelift changes included redesigned front and rear fascias and lights, and optional stop-start function on A 150 and 170 models. Active Park Assist enables the car to parallel park itself, with only throttle and brake inputs required from the driver.

The five-door Hatchback and the three-door Coupé vehicles debuted in spring 2008, alongside the refreshed 2009 M-Class and B-Class. Early models include A 160 CDI, A 180 CDI, A 200 CDI, A 150, A 170, A 200, A 200 TURBO.

Japan models went on sale in 2008-08-20. Early models 5-door versions of A 170, A 170 Elegance. Japan models of A 170 was renamed to A 180 in 2009-08-24.

A-Class Special Edition 2009 (2009–) 
It is a limited (5500 units) version for all model variants of the A-Class vehicles. It includes BlueEfficiency package, black radiator louvres, 16-inch titanium silver light-alloy wheels in a new 9-spoke design (tyre size 195/55 R16), a "Special Edition" badge on the mirror triangle, two-tone colour scheme in black and grey, Audio 20 radio with CD player and Bluetooth hands-free system and the Light and Sight package with a rain sensor, automatically dimming rear-view mirror, an illuminated vanity mirror in the sun visor, separately adjustable reading lights in the rear, a reading light for the driver and illuminated front foot wells, Seating Comfort package (height-adjustable front passenger seat, seat cushion angle adjustment and lumbar supports for the driver and front passenger). Standard exterior features also include fog lamps and a free choice of metallic paint finish.

Mercedes-Benz A-Class E-CELL (2010–) 
The Mercedes-Benz A-Class E-CELL was introduced in September 2010 and debuted at the October 2010 Paris Motor Show.

Tesla Motors, as part of its collaboration with Mercedes-Benz, built electric powertrain components for the E-Cell. The 36 kWh battery contains approximately 4,000 individual lithium-ion cells. Mercedes has developed a modular system for electric vehicles with battery and fuel-cell. This system allows the efficient use of shared parts in all the brand's electric vehicles. Thanks to the modular approach the electric drive of the A‑Class E‑Cell is also used in the B‑Class F‑Cell, and the energy storage units in the A‑Class EV are the same as the battery in the Smart fortwo electric drive.

A limited production of 500 A-Class E-Cell electric cars will be built, for trial purposes, at the Mercedes Rastatt plant, near Stuttgart beginning in September 2010. As part of a demonstration program, the cars will be leased to selected customers in several European countries, including Germany, France, and the Netherlands. Daimler is not planning to sell the electric version outside Europe.

A 180 Final Edition (2012–) 
This is a limited (300 units) version of 5-door righthand drive A 180 for the Japanese market. It included calcite white body colour, black interior colour, sport package (chrome exhaust tip, 17-inch 7-spoke alloy wheels, chrome iridium silver front grille, stainless acceleration and brake pedals with rubber stud, leather wrapped sport steering wheel and silver shift knob, silver meter panel), bi-xenon headlights and headlight washer, cornering lights, fog lamps (front/rear), rain sensor, sun visor with illuminating mirror, anti-glare mirrors, 'Final Edition' emblem, floor mats with 'Final Edition' silver logo plates.

The vehicle went on sale on 28 May 2012.

Technical data

Production 
As of 4 December 2006, 371,700 second generation A-Class units had been sold since September 2004, making it a total of 1,500,000 A-Class produced at DaimlerChrysler's Rastatt plant in ten years.

As of 26 June 2009, the 750,000th second generation A-Class vehicle was built at the Rastatt plant.

As of 1 February 2012, 1 million second generation A-Class vehicles had been delivered since autumn 2004.

In 2021, the Mercedes A-Class achieved the title of 4th best-selling car in the UK having achieved a total of 30,710 registrations.

Third generation (W176; 2013) 

The third generation of A-Class was based on the 2011 Concept A-Class and was unveiled at the 2012 Geneva Motor Show.

The vehicles were available in some markets from September 2012. Japan models went on sale in January 2013.

The third generation A-Class is designed to be a direct competitor of the BMW 1 Series and Audi A3. It is intended to be more dynamic than its predecessor and is focused on younger owners.

Concept A-Class (2011) 
The Concept A-Class is a 3-door concept car that previewed the design of the third generation A-Class and was unveiled at the 2011 New York Auto Show.

Models

Driving school package (2012–2018) 
Designed for the German RoadSense programme, the basic driving school package includes adaptation of the cockpit to accommodate the twin sets of pedals, a control switch in the centre console for driver's footwell illumination and warning signal for the twin sets of pedals, twin rearview mirrors, the Light and Sight package and the Seat Comfort package. The package is also part of the special A-Class "toBE" model, with deliveries from January 2013.

A 45 AMG (2013–2018) 

With , the A 45 and its derivation vehicles, CLA 45 and GLA 45, have the highest specific output per litre of 187.5 horsepower per litre for a four-cylinder motor in the passenger car sector as of September 2017. The Bugatti Chiron has the same specific output as A 45.

The vehicle was originally announced to be unveiled in the first quarter of 2013, but was later unveiled at the Geneva Motor Show. The sales release date was set for 8 April 2013, with Germany marketing beginning in June 2013.

Engines 
The A-Class is powered by a range of 4-cylinder petrol and diesel engines, with the 1.5 diesel engines being versions of a Renault unit.

Transmissions

Equipment 
Drive Kit Plus for iPhone, Mercedes-Benz phone module with Bluetooth, roof box 400 with Alustyle Quickfix carrier bars, Mercedes Sport product range (a spoiler lip for the front apron, a gleaming black radiator grille, gleaming black exterior mirror casing and waistline trim strip, a roof spoiler and rear apron trims with a diffuser look), light-alloy wheels were developed for the A-Class vehicles. The A-Class in Australia comes standard with 9 airbags.

The phone module went on sale on 4th quarter 2012.

Mercedes-Benz Sport products were produced for the A-Class (W176) vehicles.

Marketing 
As part of the A-Class launch, Mercedes-Benz started the 'A Rock' concert series with British alternative rock band Placebo. The 5-concert tour took place in Paris, Rome, Zurich, Hamburg, Madrid between June and July 2012.

Mercedes-Benz Japan had created a short anime titled "Next A-Class", ahead of the A-Class launch in Japan.

Production 
Production of the A-Class began at the Mercedes-Benz Rastatt plant in 2012.

Mercedes-Benz signed an agreement with the Finnish supplier Valmet Automotive to expand A-Class vehicle production, where Valmet will produce more than 100,000 units for Daimler from 2013 through 2016, the agreement was later continued to cover the rest of the production time of the third version which came to an end when production of the fourth version began in 2018. In 2017 Mercedes-Benz signed a new agreement with the Finnish supplier for the fourth version.

Production of A-series BlueDirect 4-cylinder engines took place at Mercedes-Benz engine production plant in Kölleda.

Pre-facelift styling

Post-facelift styling

Fourth generation (W177; 2018) 

The W177 Mercedes-Benz A-Class is the fourth and current generation of the A-Class range of subcompact executive hatchbacks. It was launched in 2018 as the successor to the W176 Mercedes-Benz A-Class and sales commenced in March 2018. It is available as a 5-door hatchback (W177 model code), 4-door sedan (V177), and a long-wheelbase sedan exclusive to China (Z177). In North America, the hatchback is available in Canada and Mexico, but in the US, only the sedan is available.

The fourth generation A-Class hatchback was unveiled to media in February 2018 in Amsterdam ahead of its public debut at the 2018 Geneva Motor Show. At launch Mercedes-Benz revealed the vehicle's "predator face", which is also implemented in the C257 CLS and C118 CLA, which will not spread throughout the brand's entire range of cars.

References

Notes

Bibliography

General

Workshop manuals

External links 

Official website

2000s cars
2010s cars
2020s cars
Cars introduced in 1997
Compact cars
Euro NCAP small family cars
Front-wheel-drive vehicles
All-wheel-drive vehicles
Hatchbacks
A-class
Subcompact cars
Touring cars
Vehicles with CVT transmission